BC Spartak Saint Petersburg is a Russian professional basketball team that is based in Saint Petersburg, Russia. During the 2016–17 season, the club was named BC Kondrashin Belov (BCKB), after its former player Alexander Belov and its former head coach Vladimir Kondrashin.

History
The club was originally established on September 8, 1935, as BC Spartak Leningrad. The club then became known as BC Spartak Saint Petersburg in 1991. 

The club was disbanded on July 31, 2014, due to financial problems. However, it was later reestablished for the 2016–17 season, under the name of BC Kondrashin Belov, in honor of Alexander Belov and Vladimir Kondrashin.

In February 2017, the club once again took the name of BC Spartak Saint Petersburg, and signed a sponsorship contract with VTB, one of the largest state-owned banks in Russia.

Home arenas
The 7,000-seat Yubileyni Arena was the long-time home arena of BC Spartak Saint Petersburg. After that, the club moved to the 7,120-seat Sibur Arena.

Since 2017, the club hosts its games at the Nova Arena complex.

Honors

Domestic competitions
Soviet League / Russian Championship
 Winners (2): 1974–75, 1991–92
 Runners-up (9): 1969–70, 1970–71, 1971–72, 1972–73, 1973–74, 1975–76, 1977–78, 1990–91, 1992–93
 3rd place (6): 1968–69, 1980–81, 1984–85, 1985–86, 1986–87, 2012–13
Soviet Cup / Russian Cup
 Winners (3): 1977–78, 1986–87, 2010–11
 Runners-up (2): 1999–00, 2012–13

European competitions
FIBA Saporta Cup (Defunct)
 Winners (2): 1972–73, 1974–75
 Runners-up (1): 1970–71

Season by season

The road to the European Cup victories

1972–73 FIBA European Cup Winners' Cup
{| class="wikitable" style="text-align: left; font-size:95%"
|- bgcolor="#ccccff"
! Round
! Team
! Home
!   Away  
|-
|1st
|colspan=3|Bye
|-
|2nd
| Solna
| style="text-align:center;"|104–64
| style="text-align:center;"|115–67
|-
|rowspan=2|QF
| Mobilquatro Milano
| style="text-align:center;"|72–57
| style="text-align:center;"|54–59
|-
| Spartak ZJŠ Brno
| style="text-align:center;"|82–74
| style="text-align:center;"|82–77
|-
|SF
| Juventud Schweppes
| style="text-align:center;"|95–64
| style="text-align:center;"|57–54
|-
|F
| Jugoplastika
|colspan=2 align="center"|77–62
|}1974–75 FIBA European Cup Winners' Cup'''

Players

Current roster

Notable players

 Alexander Belov (1966–1978)
 Vladimir Arzamaskov (1969–1977)
 Ivan Dvorny (1969–1973)
 Sergei Tarakanov (1975–1979)
  Sergei Panov (1991–1993)
 Andrei Kirilenko (1997–1998)
 Anton Ponkrashov (2004–2006)
 Kasib Powell (2006–2007)
 Boniface N'Dong (2006–2007)
 Antonio Porta (2007–2008)
 Rafael Araújo (2007–2008)
 Joe Blair (2008–2009)
  Steve Leven (2008–2009)
 James White (2009–2010)
 Levance Fields (2009–2010)
 Pero Antić (2010–2011)
 Smush Parker (2010–2011)
 Patrick Beverley (2011–2012)
  Yotam Halperin
 Loukas Mavrokefalidis (2011–2013)
 Radoslav Peković (2017—)

Head coaches

   Vladimir Kondrashin (1967–1995)
  Igors Miglinieks (2007–2008)
  Evgeniy Pashutin (2008–2009)
  Zvi Sherf (2010–2011)
  Jure Zdovc (2011–2013)
  Gundars Vētra (2013–2014)
  Sergei Grishaev (2015–2016)
  Alexey Vasileiv (2016–2017)
  Zakhar Pashutin (2017–)

References

External links

Official Website 
Eurobasket.com Team Info

 
Basketball teams in Russia
Basketball teams established in 1935
BC
Basketball teams in the Soviet Union
1935 establishments in Russia